Mason Earle Barrett (born 24 September 1999) is a professional footballer who plays as a defender for Wealdstone.

Career
Barrett joined Watford from West Ham United in August 2019 on a two-year deal.

On 4 January 2020, Barrett made his debut for Watford in a 3–3 FA Cup third round draw against Tranmere Rovers.

On 30 July 2022, Barrett signed for Wealdstone, following a successful trial period at the club. He made his debut for the club a week later, in a 3-2 win against Bromley.

Career statistics

Notes

References

Living people
1999 births
English footballers
Association football defenders
West Ham United F.C. players
Watford F.C. players
Wealdstone F.C. players
National League (English football) players
Black British sportspeople